This is a list of glaciers in the Antarctic with a name starting with the letters A–H. This list does not include ice sheets, ice caps or ice fields, such as the Antarctic ice sheet, but includes glacial features that are defined by their flow, rather than general bodies of ice. This list includes outlet glaciers, valley glaciers, cirque glaciers, tidewater glaciers and ice streams. Ice streams are a type of glacier and many of them have "glacier" in their name, e.g. Pine Island Glacier. Ice shelves are listed separately in the List of Antarctic ice shelves. For the purposes of this list, the Antarctic is defined as any latitude further south than 60° (the continental limit according to the Antarctic Treaty System).

List of glaciers (A–H)

See also 
 List of Antarctic and subantarctic islands 
 List of Antarctic ice shelves
 List of Antarctic ice streams
 List of glaciers
 List of subantarctic glaciers

References 

A-H
Glaciers: A-H
Antarctic: A-H